Spectre is a video game for the Apple II written by Bob Flanagan and Scott Miller and published by Datamost in 1982.

Spectre is a Pac-Man variant with a goal of collecting dots while avoiding "Questers." The player navigates the maze with a 3D view on the left side of the screen and a top-down representation on the right.

A Spectre advertisement reads:

See also
3-Demon

References

External links

1982 video games
Apple II games
Apple II-only games
Datamost games
Pac-Man clones
Video games developed in the United States
Single-player video games